"I Follow Rivers" is a song by Swedish recording artist Lykke Li from her second studio album, Wounded Rhymes (2011). Produced by Björn Yttling of Peter Bjorn and John, it was released on 21January 2011 as the album's second single. The track premiered exclusively on SPIN.com on 10January 2011.

Belgian DJ/producer The Magician remixed and reworked "I Follow Rivers" in 2011, peaking at number one in Belgium, Germany, Italy, Poland, and Romania, number two in Switzerland, Austria, Ireland, and the Netherlands, and number four in France. The remix was deemed "'90s house".
Belgian band Triggerfinger covered "I Follow Rivers" in 2012, peaking at number one in Austria, Belgium and the Netherlands.

Music video
The music video, directed by Tarik Saleh and filmed at Närsholmen on the Swedish island of Gotland, features Li in a black robe and veil chasing a man (Swedish-Lebanese actor Fares Fares) through a snowy landscape. An unofficial music video consisting of scenes from the French film Blue Is the Warmest Colour played with The Magician's remix was uploaded to YouTube by user Aldo Zuga on March 9, 2014, and has over 397 million views as of August 2022, surpassing the original music video's 82 million views as of August 2022.

Track listings 
Danish, Finnish, Norwegian and Swedish iTunes EP – Remixes
"I Follow Rivers" – 3:42
"I Follow Rivers" (Dave Sitek Remix) – 3:58
"I Follow Rivers" (The Magician Remix) – 4:40
"I Follow Rivers" (Van Rivers & The Sublimial Kid) – 6:41

UK iTunes EP
"I Follow Rivers" – 3:48
"I Follow Rivers" (Dave Sitek Remix) – 3:58
"I Follow Rivers" (Van Rivers & The Sublimial Kid) – 6:41

UK 7" single
A. "I Follow Rivers" – 3:48
B. "Get Some" (Primary 1 Remix)

UK 12" single – The Remixes
A1. "I Follow Rivers" – 3:48
A2. "I Follow Rivers" (The Magician Remix) – 4:40
B1. "I Follow Rivers" (Van Rivers & The Subliminal Kid Remix) – 6:41
B2. "I Follow Rivers" (Tyler, The Creator Remix) – 3:41

German CD single
"I Follow Rivers" (The Magician Remix) – 4:40
"I Follow Rivers" (Radio Edit) – 3:20

Charts

Weekly charts

Year-end charts

Decade-end charts

All-time charts

Certifications 

|-

Triggerfinger version 

Belgian band Triggerfinger covered "I Follow Rivers" during Giel Beelen's show on the Dutch radio station 3FM in what was called "a fragile version". They used glasses, cups and knives to create a rhythmical background section. Triggerfinger's version was released as a single on 24 February 2012, topping the singles chart in Austria, Belgium and the Netherlands, while reaching number nine in Germany and number seventeen in Switzerland.

Track listings 
Belgian and Dutch iTunes single
"I Follow Rivers" (Live@Giel! – VARA/3FM) – 3:34

German CD single
"I Follow Rivers" (Live@Giel!)	– 3:35
"Let It Ride" – 3:24

Charts

Weekly charts

Year-end charts

Certifications

Other versions and use in media 
 "I Follow Rivers" was performed by Jenna Ushkowitz's character Tina Cohen-Chang in the Glee episode "A Night of Neglect", originally aired 19 April 2011.
 American indie rock band Plain Jane Automobile covered "I Follow Rivers" and released it online in February 2012.
 The song was covered in German by FC Bayern München ultras, as I Follow FC Bayern and was in this year, in the Lykke Li Version, the Song for Ran TV Intro.
 The Magician remix of the song was featured in the 2012 French film Rust and Bone and also in the 2013 film Blue Is the Warmest Colour.
 The song was used in some Colombiana trailers.
 The remix version of the song was played as background music in episode 8 of Turkish series "Medcezir" 
 British singer-songwriter Marika Hackman included a cover on her 2014 Deaf Heat EP
 The song appeared in the third episode of the ninth season of CSI: NY, 2,918 Miles, when Linsay and Sheldon process the evidence.
 Jason Isbell & Amanda Shires covered the song on a 2015 two-song EP entitled Sea Songs.
 The song was used in the 2016 commercial for American fashion brand Tommy Hilfiger's new fragrance, The Girl, featuring supermodel Gigi Hadid.
 The Magician remix is featured in the 2016 video game Forza Horizon 3.
 French band Dionysos covered the song on their 2016 Vampire en pyjama album.
 Israeli singer-songwriter Roni Alter  released an acoustic cover (together with Alon Lotringer) as a single in 2016.

See also 
 List of Airplay 100 number ones of the 2010s
 List of Dutch Top 40 number-one singles of 2012
 List of number-one hits of 2012 (Austria)
 List of number-one hits of 2012 (Germany)
 List of number-one hits of 2013 (Italy)
 List of number-one singles of 2012 (Poland)
 List of Romanian Top 100 number ones of the 2010s
 List of Ultratop 50 number-one singles of 2011
 List of Ultratop 50 number-one singles of 2012

References 

2011 singles
2011 songs
2012 singles
Atlantic Records singles
Dutch Top 40 number-one singles
Lykke Li songs
Number-one singles in Austria
Number-one singles in Germany
Number-one singles in Greece
Number-one singles in Italy
Number-one singles in Poland
Number-one singles in Romania
Number-one singles in Russia
Songs written by Rick Nowels
Ultratop 50 Singles (Flanders) number-one singles
Ultratop 50 Singles (Wallonia) number-one singles
Songs written by Björn Yttling
Songs written by Lykke Li